Karkoj is a town located in Sennar, Sudan.

References

Populated places in Sennar (state)